Donald W. Smith (born April 7, 1968 in North Tonawanda, New York) is an American rower. He finished 5th in the men's eight at the 1996 Summer Olympics.

References 
 
 

1968 births
Living people
American male rowers
People from North Tonawanda, New York
Rowers at the 1996 Summer Olympics
Rowers at the 2000 Summer Olympics
Olympic rowers of the United States
World Rowing Championships medalists for the United States
Pan American Games medalists in rowing
Pan American Games gold medalists for the United States
Rowers at the 1995 Pan American Games
Medalists at the 1995 Pan American Games